The 2013 Nürbrugring GP2 Series round was a GP2 Series motor race held on July 6 and 7, 2013 at Nürburgring, Germany. It was the sixth round of the 2013 GP2 season. The race supported the 2013 German Grand Prix.

Classification

Qualifying

Feature Race

Sprint Race

See also 
 2013 German Grand Prix
 2013 Nürburgring GP3 Series round

References

2013 GP2 Series rounds
2013 in German motorsport
Sport in Rhineland-Palatinate